John Crabtree may refer to:

 John Crabtree (businessman), lawyer, businessman and Lord Lieutenant of the West Midlands of England
John F. Crabtree, namesake of Crabtree, California, homesteader
John A. Crabtree, owner of John A. Crabtree House
John J. Crabtree, namesake of Crabtree, Oregon, pioneer from Virginia

See also
Jack Crabtree (disambiguation)